"True Love" is a song written by Pat Alger, and recorded by American country music artist Don Williams.  It was released in January 1991 as the second single and title track from Williams' album True Love.  The song reached number 4 on the Billboard Hot Country Singles & Tracks chart in April 1991.

Chart performance

Year-end charts

References

1991 singles
Don Williams songs
Songs written by Pat Alger
Song recordings produced by Garth Fundis
RCA Records singles
1991 songs